This article lists the in the water and  on the water forms of aquatic sports for 2016.

2016 Summer Olympics (FINA–Aquatics)
 February 19–24: 2016 FINA Diving World Cup in  Rio de Janeiro (Olympic Test Event)
  won both the gold and overall medal tallies.
 March 2–6: Aquece Rio Synchronized Swimming 2016 in  Rio de Janeiro (Olympic Test Event)
 Duet winners:  (Gemma Mengual, Ona Carbonell, Paula Klamburg)
 Team winners:  
 April 15–20: Aquece Rio Swimming 2016 (Maria Lenk Trophy) in  Rio de Janeiro at the Olympic Aquatics Stadium (Olympic Test Event)
 For results, click here.
 June 11 & 12: 2016 Marathon Swimming Olympic Games Qualification Tournament in  Setúbal
 Men's winner:  ZU Lijun
 Women's winner:  Xin Xin
 August 6–13: Swimming at the 2016 Summer Olympics in  Rio de Janeiro at the Olympic Aquatics Stadium

 The  won both the gold and overall medal tallies.
 August 7–19: Diving at the 2016 Summer Olympics in  Rio de Janeiro at the Maria Lenk Aquatics Center
 Men's 3m Springboard:   Cao Yuan;   Jack Laugher;   Patrick Hausding
 Women's 3m Springboard:   Shi Tingmao;   He Zi;   Tania Cagnotto
 Men's 10m Platform:   Chen Aisen;   Germán Sánchez;   David Boudia
 Women's 10m Platform:   Ren Qian;   Si Yajie;   Meaghan Benfeito
 Men's Synchronized 3m Springboard:
   (Chris Mears & Jack Laugher)
   (Sam Dorman & Michael Hixon)
   (Cao Yuan & Qin Kai)
 Men's Synchronized 10m Platform:
   (Chen Aisen & Lin Yue)
   (David Boudia & Steele Johnson)
   (Tom Daley & Daniel Goodfellow)
 Women's Synchronized 3m Springboard: 
   (Shi Tingmao & Wu Minxia)
   (Tania Cagnotto & Francesca Dallapé)
   (Maddison Keeney & Anabelle Smith)
 Women's Synchronized 10m Platform:
   (Chen Ruolin & Liu Huixia)
   (Cheong Jun Hoong & Pandelela Rinong)
   (Meaghan Benfeito & Roseline Filion)
 August 15: Women's 10km marathon swimming in  Rio de Janeiro at Fort Copacabana
   Sharon van Rouwendaal;   Rachele Bruni;   Poliana Okimoto
 August 15–20: Synchronized swimming at the 2016 Summer Olympics in  Rio de Janeiro at the Maria Lenk Aquatics Center
 Duet:
   (Natalia Ishchenko & Svetlana Romashina)
   (Huang Xuechen & Sun Wenyan)
   (Yukiko Inui & Risako Mitsui)
 Team:  ;  ;  
 August 16: Men's 10km marathon swimming in  Rio de Janeiro at Fort Copacabana
   Ferry Weertman;   Spyridon Gianniotis;   Marc-Antoine Olivier

2016 FINA 10 km Marathon Swimming World Cup & World Events
 February 6 & 7: World Cup and Event #1 in  Carmen de Patagones-Viedma, Río Negro
 Men's winner:  Alex Meyer
 Women's winner:  Rachele Bruni
 February 26 & 27: World Cup and Event #2 in  Abu Dhabi
 Men's winner:  Marc Antoine Olivier
 Women's winner:  Aurélie Muller
 June 18: World Cup and Event #3 in  Balatonfüred
 Men's winner:  Simone Ruffini
 Women's winner:  Rachele Bruni
 July 28: World Cup and Event #4 in  Lac Saint-Jean
 Men's winner:  Philippe Guertin
 Women's winner:  Stephanie Horner
 August 13: World Cup and Event #5 in  Lake Mégantic
 Men's winner:  Andreas Waschburger
 Women's winner:  Arianna Bridi
 October 9: World Cup and Event #6 in  Chun'an County-Hangzhou
 Men's winner:  Simone Ruffini
 Women's winner:  Xin Xin
 October 15: World Cup and Event #7 (final) in 
 Men's winner:  Simone Ruffini
 Women's winner:  Rachele Bruni

2016 FINA Open Water Swimming Grand Prix
 July 30: Grand Prix #1 in  Lac Saint-Jean
 Men's winner:  Alex Meyer
 Women's winner:  Olga Kozydub
 August 20: Grand Prix #2 in  Lake Ohrid
 Men's winner:  Tomi Stefanovski
 Women's winner:  Olga Kozydub
 September 4: Grand Prix #3 (final) in  Capri, Campania-Naples
 Men's winner:  Evgenij Pop Acev
 Women's winner:  Pilar Geijo

Diving

2016 FINA Diving World Series
 March 11–13: DWS #1 in  Beijing
 Men's 3m Springboard winner:  Cao Yuan
 Women's 3m Springboard winner:  Shi Tingmao
 Men's 10m Platform winner:  Chen Aisen
 Women's 10m Platform winner:  Si Yajie
 Men's Synchronized 3m Springboard winners:  (Cao Yuan, Qin Kai)
 Women's Synchronized 3m Springboard winners:  (He Zi, Wang Han)
 Men's Synchronized 10m Platform winners:  (Lin Yue, Chen Aisen)
 Women's Synchronized 10m Platform winners:  (Liu Huixia, Si Yajie)
 Mixed Synchronized 3m Springboard winners:  (Wang Han, Yang Hao)
 Mixed Synchronized 10m Platform winners:  (Tai Xiaohu, Chang Yani)
 March 17–19: DWS #2 in  Dubai
 Men's 3m Springboard winner:  Cao Yuan
 Women's 3m Springboard winner:  Shi Tingmao
 Men's 10m Platform winner:  Yang Hao
 Women's 10m Platform winner:  Liu Huixia
 Men's Synchronized 3m Springboard winners:  (Cao Yuan, Qin Kai)
 Women's Synchronized 3m Springboard winners:  (He Zi, Wang Han)
 Men's Synchronized 10m Platform winners:  (Lin Yue, Chen Aisen)
 Women's Synchronized 10m Platform winners:  (Liu Huixia, Si Yajie)
 Mixed Sychronized 3m Springboard winners:  (Wang Han, Yang Hao)
 Mixed Synchronized 10m Platform winners:  (Tai Xiaohu, Chang Yani)
 April 15–17: DWS #3 in  Windsor, Ontario
 Men's 3m Springboard winner:  Cao Yuan
 Women's 3m Springboard winner:  He Zi
 Men's 10m Platform winner:  Chen Aisen
 Women's 10m Platform winner:  Ren Qian
 Men's Synchronized 3m Springboard winners:  (Qin Kai, Cao Yuan)
 Women's Synchronized 3m Springboard winners:  (He Zi, Wang Han)
 Men's Synchronized 10m Platform winners:  (Lin Yue, Chen Aisen)
 Women's Synchronized 10m Platform winners:  (Chen Ruolin, Liu Huixia)
 Mixed Sychronized 3m Springboard winners:  (Jennifer Abel, François Imbeau-Dulac)
 Mixed Synchronized 10m Platform winners:  (Tai Xiaohu, Chang Yani)
 April 22–24: DWS #4 (final) in  Kazan
 Men's 3m Springboard winner:  Cao Yuan
 Women's 3m Springboard winner:  He Zi
 Men's 10m Platform winner:  Chen Aisen
 Women's 10m Platform winner:  Ren Qian
 Men's Synchronized 3m Springboard winners:  (Ilya Zakharov, Evgeny Kuznetsov)
 Women's Synchronized 3m Springboard winners:  (He Zi, Wang Han)
 Men's Synchronized 10m Platform winners:  (Lin Yue, Chen Aisen)
 Women's Synchronized 10m Platform winners:  (Chen Ruolin, Liu Huixia)
 Mixed Synchronized 3m Springboard winners:  (Wang Han, Yang Hao)
 Mixed Synchronized 10m Platform winners:  (Tai Xiaohu, Chang Yani)

2016 FINA Diving Grand Prix
 January 15–17: DGP #1 in  Madrid
 Men's 3m Springboard winner:  Constantin Blaha
 Women's 3m Springboard winner:  XU Zhihuan
 Men's 10m Platform winner:  Yang Hao
 Women's 10m Platform winner:  XIA Bingqing
 Men's Synchronized 3m Springboard winners:  Zhao Dong / Li Jiawei
 Women's Synchronized 3m Springboard winners:  XU Zhihuan / Wang Han
 Men's Synchronized 10m Platform winners:  JIE Lianjun / Yang Hao
 Women's Synchronized 10m Platform winners:  XIA Bingqing / XIA Yujie
 January 29–31: DGP #2 in  Rostock
 Men's 3m Springboard winner:  Patrick Hausding
 Women's 3m Springboard winner:  HE Xiaojie
 Men's 10m Platform winner:  Yang Jian
 Women's 10m Platform winner:  DING Yaying
 Men's Synchronized 3m Springboard winners:  Philippe Gagné / François Imbeau-Dulac
 Women's Synchronized 3m Springboard winners:  CHEN Jiayu / HE Xiaojie
 Men's Synchronized 10m Platform winners:  XU Zewei / TAI Xiaohu
 Women's Synchronized 10m Platform winners:  DING Yaying / SUO Miya
 March 31 – April 3: DGP #3 in  San Juan, Puerto Rico
 Men's 3m Springboard winner:  Matthieu Rosset
 Women's 3m Springboard winner:  WU Chunting
 Men's 10m Platform winner:  LIAN Junjie
 Women's 10m Platform winner:  Samantha Bromberg
 Men's Synchronized 3m Springboard winners:  PENG Jianfeng / SUN Zhiyi
 Women's Synchronized 3m Springboard winners:  WU Chunting / XU Zhihuan
 Men's Synchronized 10m Platform winners:  HUANG Bowen / XU Zewei
 Women's Synchronized 10m Platform winners:  SUO Miya / LI Jinming
 Mixed Synchronized 3m Springboard winners:  HUANG Bowen / WU Chunting
 April 7–10: DGP #4 in  Gatineau
 Men's 3m Springboard winner:  Matthieu Rosset
 Women's 3m Springboard winner:  WU Chunting
 Men's 10m Platform winner:  Vincent Riendeau
 Women's 10m Platform winner:  Roseline Filion
 Men's Synchronized 3m Springboard winners:  Philippe Gagné / François Imbeau-Dulac
 Women's Synchronized 3m Springboard winners:  WU Chunting / XU Zhihuan
 Men's Synchronized 10m Platform winners:  XU Zewei / HUANG Bowen
 Women's Synchronized 10m Platform winners:  Meaghan Benfeito / Roseline Filion
 Mixed Synchronized 3m Springboard winners:  WU Chunting / HUANG Bowen
 Mixed Synchronized 10m Platform winners:  SUO Miya / LIAN Junjie
 July 15–17: DGP #5 in  Bolzano
 Men's 3m Springboard winner:  Guillaume Dutoit
 Women's 3m Springboard winner:  Tania Cagnotto
 Men's 10m Platform winner:  Yang Hao
 Women's 10m Platform winner:  Minami Itahashi
 Men's Synchronized 3m Springboard winners:  Patrick Hausding / Stephan Feck
 Women's Synchronized 3m Springboard winners:  Tania Cagnotto / Francesca Dallapé
 Men's Synchronized 10m Platform winners:  XU Zewei / Yang Hao
 Women's Synchronized 10m Platform winners:  Nana Sasaki / Matsuri Arai
 Mixed Synchronized 3m Springboard winners:  Sebastián Villa / Diana Pineda
 Mixed Synchronized 10m Platform winners:  Zachary Cooper / Tarrin Gilliland
 October 21–23: DGP #6 in  Kuching
 Men's 3m Springboard winner:  Xie Siyi
 Women's 3m Springboard winner:  Ng Yan Yee
 Men's 10m Platform winner:  Yang Hao
 Women's 10m Platform winner:  LIAN Jie
 Men's Synchronized 3m Springboard winners:  Xie Siyi / HUANG Bowen
 Women's Synchronized 3m Springboard winners:  XU Zhihuan / Wang Han
 Men's Synchronized 10m Platform winners:  Yang Hao / XU Zewei
 Women's Synchronized 10m Platform winners:  XIA Bingqing / XIA Yujie
 October 27–30: DGP #7 in  Gold Coast, Queensland
 Men's 3m Springboard winner:  PENG Jianfeng
 Women's 3m Springboard winner:  Georgia Sheehan
 Men's 10m Platform winner:  Yang Jian
 Women's 10m Platform winner:  LIAN Jie
 Men's Synchronized 3m Springboard winners:  Xie Siyi / HUANG Bowen
 Women's Synchronized 3m Springboard winners:  XU Zhihuan / Wang Han
 Men's Synchronized 10m Platform winners:  Yang Hao / XU Zewei (default)
 Women's Synchronized 10m Platform winners:  XIA Bingqing / XIA Yujie
 November 4–6: DGP #8 (final) in 
 Men's 3m Springboard winner:  CHEN Linhai
 Women's 3m Springboard winner:  Hazuki Miyamoto
 Men's 10m Platform winner:  Nishida Reo
 Women's 10m Platform winner:  Nana Sasaki
 Men's Synchronized 3m Springboard winners:  CHEN Linhai / LI Linwei
 Women's Synchronized 10m Platform winners:  Matsuri Arai / Nana Sasaki
 Mixed Synchronized 3m Springboard winners:  Hazuki Miyamoto / Nishida Reo
 Mixed Synchronized 10m Platform winners:  Yevhen Naumenko / Valeriia Liulko (default)

2016 Red Bull Cliff Diving World Series
 June 4: #1 in  Fort Worth, Texas
 Winners:  Jonathan Paredes (m) /  Rhiannan Iffland (f)
 June 18: #2 in  Copenhagen
 Winner:  Gary Hunt
 July 9: #3 in  São Miguel Island
 Winners:  Gary Hunt (m) /  Rhiannan Iffland (f)
 July 23: #4 in  La Rochelle
 Winner:  Gary Hunt (m) 
 August 28: #5 in  Polignano a Mare
 Winners:  Artem Silchenko (m) /  Lysanne Richard (f)
 September 11: #6 in  Pembrokeshire
 Winners:  Michal Navrátil (m) /  Rhiannan Iffland (f)
 September 24: #7 in  Mostar
 Winners:  Michal Navrátil (m) /  Lysanne Richard (f)
 October 16: #8 in  Shirahama, Wakayama
 Winners:  Sergio Guzman (m) /  Rhiannan Iffland (f)
 October 28: #9 in  Dubai
 Winners:  Andy Jones (m) /  Rhiannan Iffland (f)

Other diving events
 February 27–29: 2016 FINA High Diving World Cup in  Abu Dhabi
 Men's (27 metres) winner:  Gary Hunt
 Women's (20 metres) winner:  Lysanne Richard
 June 28 – July 3: 2016 European Junior Diving Championships in  Rijeka
 Boys' Platform winner:  Matthew Dixon
 Boys' Synchro winners:  Lou Massenberg / Patrick Kreisel 
 Boys' 1 m winner:  Francesco Porco 
 Boys' 3 m winner:  Patrick Kreisel
 Girls' Platform winner:  Christina Wassen
 Girls' Synchro winners:  Madeline Coquoz / Michelle Heimberg
 Girls' 1 m winner:  Kaja Skrzek
 Girls' 3 m winner:  Kaja Skrzek
 November 28 – December 4: 2016 FINA World Junior Diving Championships in  Kazan
  won both the gold and overall medal tallies.

Swimming
 July 6–10: 2016 European Junior Swimming Championships in  Hódmezővásárhely
  won the gold medal tally. Russia and  won 22 overall medals each.
 December 6–11: 2016 FINA World Swimming Championships (25 m) in  Windsor, Ontario
 The  won both the gold and overall medal tallies.

2016 FINA Swimming World Cup
 August 26 & 27: SWC #1 in  Paris-Chartres
  won the gold medal tally.  won the overall medal tally.
 August 30 & 31: SWC #2 in  Berlin
  won the gold medal tally.  won the overall medal tally.
 September 3 & 4: SWC #3 in  Moscow
  and  won 8 gold medals each. Russia won the overall medal tally.
 September 30 & October 1: SWC #4 in  Beijing
  won both the gold and overall medal tallies.
 October 4 & 5: SWC #5 in  Dubai
  won both the gold and overall medal tallies.
 October 8 & 9: SWC #6 in  Doha
  won both the gold and overall medal tallies.
 October 21 & 22: SWC #7 in 
  won both the gold and overall medal tallies.
 October 25 & 26: SWC #8 in  Tokyo
  won the gold medal tally.  won the overall medal tally.
 October 29 & 30: SWC #9 (final) in 
  won both the gold and overall medal tallies.

Synchronised swimming
 June 22–26: 2016 European Junior Synchronised Swimming Championships in  Rijeka
 Solo winner:  Veronika Kalinina
 Duet winners:  (Daria Kulagina, Veronika Kalinina)
 Figures winner:  Varvara Subbotina
 Team winners: 
 Combination winners: 
 July 9–13: 2016 FINA World Junior Synchronized Swimming Championships in  Kazan
 Solo winner:  Varvara Subbotina
 Duet winners:  (Veronika Kalinina, Daria Kulagina, Varvara Subbotina)
 Team winners: 
 Combination winners:

LEN aquatic events
 May 9–22: 2016 European Aquatics Championships in  London
Great Britain won the overall medal tally. 
 July 10–14: 2016 European Open Water Swimming Championships in  Hoorn
  won both the gold and overall medal tallies.
 September 9–11: 2016 European Junior Open Water Swimming Championships in  Piombino
Italy won the overall medal tally.

Canoeing
 February 12 – September 11:  2016 ICF Events Calendar

2016 Summer Olympics (ICF)
 May 18 & 19: 2016 Canoe Sprint European Continental Olympic Qualifier in  Duisburg
  won both the gold and overall medal tallies.
 August 7–11: 2016 Summer Olympics in  Rio de Janeiro at the Olympic Whitewater Stadium (Whitewater slalom)
 Men's C1:   Denis Gargaud Chanut;   Matej Beňuš;   Takuya Haneda
 Men's C2: 
   (Ladislav Škantár & Peter Škantár)
   (David Florence & Richard Hounslow)
   (Gauthier Klauss & Matthieu Péché)
 Men's K1:   Joe Clarke;   Peter Kauzer;   Jiří Prskavec
 Women's K1:   Maialen Chourraut;   Luuka Jones;   Jessica Fox
 August 15–20: 2016 Summer Olympics in  Rio de Janeiro at the Rodrigo de Freitas Lagoon (Canoe sprint)
 Men
 Men's C1 200m:   Yuriy Cheban;   Valentin Demyanenko;   Isaquias Queiroz
 Men's C1 1,000m:   Sebastian Brendel;   Isaquias Queiroz;   Serghei Tarnovschi
 Men's C2 1,000m:
   (Sebastian Brendel & Jan Vandrey)
   (Erlon Silva & Isaquias Queiroz)
   (Dmytro Ianchuk &  Taras Mishchuk)
 Men's K1 200m:   Liam Heath;   Maxime Beaumont;   Saúl Craviotto;   Ronald Rauhe
 Men's K1 1,000m:   Marcus Walz;   Josef Dostál;   Roman Anoshkin
 Men's K2 200m:
   (Saúl Craviotto & Cristian Toro)
   (Liam Heath & Jon Schofield
   (Aurimas Lankas & Edvinas Ramanauskas
 Men's K2 1,000m:
   (Max Rendschmidt & Marcus Gross)
   (Marko Tomićević & Milenko Zorić)
   (Ken Wallace & Lachlan Tame)
 Men's K4 1,000m:  ;  ;  
 Women
 Women's K1 200m:   Lisa Carrington;   Marta Walczykiewicz;   Inna Osypenko-Radomska
 Women's K1 500m:   Danuta Kozák;   Emma Jørgensen;   Lisa Carrington
 Women's K2 500m:
   (Gabriella Szabó & Danuta Kozák)
   (Franziska Weber & Tina Dietze)
   (Karolina Naja & Beata Mikołajczyk)
 Women's K4 500m:  ;  ;

Canoe sprint (flatwater)
 February 12 – July 31: 2016 ICF Events Calendar for Canoe Sprint

Continental and world canoe sprint championships
 February 12–14: 2016 Oceania Canoe Sprint Championships in  Adelaide

  won both the gold and overall medal tallies.
 April 1–4: 2016 African Canoe Sprint Championships in  Durban
  won the gold medal tally.  won the overall medal tally.
 May 19–22: 2016 Pan American Canoe Sprint Championships in  Gainesville, Georgia
 Senior:  won both the gold and overall medal tallies.
 Junior:  won the gold medal tally.  and  won 10 overall medals each.
 June 7–9: 2016 World University Canoe Sprint Championships in  Montemor-o-Velho
  won both the gold and overall medal tallies.
 June 24–26: 2016 Canoe Sprint European Championships in  Moscow
  and  won 5 gold medals each. Hungary won the overall medal tally.
 July 28–31: 2016 ICF Junior and U23 Canoe Sprint World Championships in  Minsk
Hungary won the overall medal tally.
 U23:  won both the gold and overall medal tallies.

2016 Canoe Sprint World Cup
 May 20–22: CSF World Cup #1 in  Duisburg
Belarus won the overall medal tally.
 May 27–29: CSF World Cup #2 in  Račice (Litoměřice District)
  won both the gold and overall medal tallies.
 June 3–5: CSF World Cup #3 (final) in  Montemor-o-Velho
  won both the gold and overall medal tallies.

Whitewater slalom (canoe)
 February 19 – September 11: 2016 ICF Events Calendar for Canoe Slalom

Continental and world whitewater slalom championships
 February 19–21: 2016 Oceania Canoe Slalom Championships in  Penrith
 Men's C1 winner:  Matej Beňuš
 Men's C2 winners:  (Franz Anton, Jan Benzien)
 Men's K1 winner:  Vavřinec Hradilek
 Women's C1 winner:  Jessica Fox
 Women's K1 winner:  Jana Dukátová
 April 23 & 24: 2016 Asian Canoe Slalom Championships in  Toyama
 Men's C1 winner:  SHU Jianming
 Men's C2 winners:  (Shota Sasaki, Tsubasa Sasaki)
 Men's K1 winner:  TAN Ya
 Women's C1 winner:  Chen Wei-han
 Women's K1 winner:  LI Lu
 Men's C1 team winners:  (WANG Sheng, SHU Jianming, CHEN Fangjia)
 Men's C2 team winners:  
 Men's K1 team winners:  (Kazuya Adachi, Tsubasa Sasaki, Taku Yoshida)
 Women's C1 team winners:  (Xeniya Kondratenko, Kamilla Safina, Yekaterina Smirnova)
 Women's K1 team winners:  (Yuriko Takeshita, Haruka Okazaki, Ren Mishima)
 May 13–15: 2016 European Canoe Slalom Championships in   Liptovský Mikuláš
 Men's C1 winner:  Alexander Slafkovský
 Women's C1 winner:  Nuria Vilarrubla
 Men's C2 winners:  (Tomáš Kučera, Ján Bátik)
 Men's K1 winner:  Jiří Prskavec
 Women's K1 winner:  Melanie Pfeifer
 Men's C1 team winners: 
 Women's C1 team winners: 
 Men's C2 team winners: 
 Men's K1 team winners: 
 Women's K1 team winners:  
 July 12–17: 2016 ICF Junior and U23 Canoe Slalom World Championships in  Kraków
Junior
 Men's Junior C1 winner:  Marko Mirgorodsky
 Men's Junior C2 winners:  (Albert Kaspar, Vojtech Mruzek)
 Men's Junior K1 winner:  Ruslan Pestov
 Men's Junior Team C1 winners:  (Gregor Kreul, Lennard Tuchscherer)
 Men's Junior Team C2 winners: 
 Men's Junior Team K1 winners:  (Thomas Durand, Paul Cornut-Chauvinc)
 Women's Junior C1 winner:  Tereza Fišerová
 Women's Junior K1 winner:  Klaudia Zwolinska
 Women's Junior Team C1 winners:  (Alsu Minazova, Anastasia Kozyreva)
 Women's Junior Team K1 winners:  (Tereza Fišerová, Karolina Galuskova, Katerina Duskova)
U23
 Men's U23 C1 winner:  Florian Breuer
 Men's U23 C2 winners:  (Filip Brzezinski, Andrzej Brzezinski)
 Men's U23 K1 winner:  Jakub Grigar
 Men's U23 Team C1 winners:  (Cedric Joly, Thibault Blaise)
 Men's U23 Team C2 winners:  
 Men's U23 Team K1 winners:  (Stefan Hengst, Leo Bolg)
 Women's U23 C1 winner:  Jessica Fox
 Women's U23 K1 winner:  Jessica Fox
 Women's U23 Team C1 winners:  (Kimberley Woods, Jasmine Royle)
 Women's U23 Team K1 winners:  (Lisa Fritsche, Caroline Trompeter, Selina Jones)

2016 Canoe Slalom World Cup
 June 3–5: CS World Cup #1 in  Ivrea
 Men's C1 winner:  Michal Jáně
 Men's C2 winners:  (Nicola Scianimanico, Hugo Cailhol)
 Men's K1 winner:  Giovanni De Gennaro
 Men's K1 Cross winner:  Vavřinec Hradilek
 Women's C1 winner:  Jessica Fox
 Women's K1 winner:  Ricarda Funk
 Women's K1 Cross winner:  Ajda Novak
 June 10–12: CS World Cup #2 in  La Seu d'Urgell
 Men's C1 winner:  Alexander Slafkovský
 Men's C2 winners:  (Pierre-Antoine Tillard, Edern Le Ruyet)
 Men's K1 winner:  Vít Přindiš
 Men's K1 Cross winner:  Vít Přindiš
 Women's C1 winner:  Núria Vilarrubla
 Women's K1 winner:  Maialen Chourraut
 Women's K1 Cross winner:  Martina Wegman
 June 16–19: CS World Cup #3 in  Pau, Pyrénées-Atlantiques
 Men's C1 winner:  Alexander Slafkovský
 Men's C2 winners:  (Pierre-Antoine Tillard, Edern Le Ruyet)
 Men's K1 winner:  Samuel Hernanz
 Men's K1 Cross winner:  Vít Přindiš
 Women's C1 winner:  Mallory Franklin
 Women's K1 winner:  Marie-Zélia Lafont
 Women's K1 Cross winner:  Caroline Loir
 September 2–4: CS World Cup #4 in  Prague
 Men's C1 winner:  Matej Beňuš
 Men's C2 winners:  (Ladislav Škantár, Peter Škantár)
 Men's K1 winner:  Jiří Prskavec
 Men's K1 Cross winner:  Hannes Aigner
 Women's C1 winner:  Jessica Fox
 Women's K1 winner:  Ricarda Funk
 Women's K1 Cross winner:  Veronika Vojtová
 September 7–11: CS World Cup #5 (final) in  Tacen-Ljubljana
 Men's C1 winner:  Benjamin Savšek
 Men's C2 winners:  (Ladislav Škantár, Peter Škantár)
 Men's K1 winner:  Peter Kauzer
 Men's K1 Cross winner:  Boris Neveu
 Women's C1 winner:  Kimberley Woods
 Women's K1 winner:  Jessica Fox
 Women's K1 Cross winner:  Amalie Hilgertova

Other canoeing events
 May 17–19: 2016 ICF Paracanoe World Championships in  Duisburg
  won the gold medal tally.  won the overall medal tally. 
 June 1–5: 2016 ICF Wildwater Canoeing World Championships in  Banja Luka
 Men's C1 sprint winner:  Ondrej Rolenc
 Men's C1 sprint team winners:  (Ondrej Rolenc, Antonin Hales, Vladimir Slanina)
 Men's C2 sprint winners:  (Quentin Dazeur, Stephane Santamaria)
 Men's C2 sprint team winners:  (T. Debray & L. Lapointe, Q. Dazeur & S. Santamaria, A. Leduc & L. Zouggari)
 Men's K1 sprint winner:  Maxime Richard
 Men's K1 sprint team winners:  (Nejc Znidarcic, Anze Urankar, Vid Debeljak)
 Women's C1 sprint winner:  Martina Satkova
 Women's C2 sprint winners:  (Barobora Kortisova, Katarina Kopunova)
 Women's K1 sprint winner:  Hannah Brown
 Women's K1 sprint team winners:  (Claire Bren, Manon Hostens, Phenicia Dupras)
 August 29 – September 4: 2016 ICF Canoe Polo World Championships in  Syracuse, Sicily
 Men:  defeated , 6–5 in overtime, to win their first ICF Canoe Polo World Championships title.
  took the bronze medal.
 Women:  defeated , 3–2, to win their first ICF Women's Canoe Polo World Championships title.
  took the bronze medal.
 Men U21:  defeated , 5–4 in overtime, to win their first ICF Men's U21 Canoe Polo World Championships title.
  took the bronze medal.
 Women's U21:  defeated , 2–1 in overtime, to win their third consecutive ICF Women's U21 Canoe Polo World Championships title.
  took the bronze medal.
 September 8–11: 2016 ICF Dragon Boat World Championships in  Moscow
  won both the gold and overall medal tallies.
 September 16–18: 2016 ICF Canoe Marathon World Championships in  Brandenburg an der Havel
 Men's C1 26.2 km:  Márton Kover
 Men's C2 26.2 km:  (Márton Kover, Ádám Docze)
 Men's K1 29.8 km:  Hank McGregor
 Men's K2 29.8 km:  (Hank McGregor, Jasper Mocke)
 Men's U23 C1 22.6 km:  Bence Balázs Dori
 Men's U23 K1 26.2 km:  Ádám Petro
 Women's C1 19 km:  Zsanett Lakatos
 Women's K1 26.2 km:  Renáta Csay
 Women's K2 26.2 km:  (Renáta Csay, Alexandra Bara)
 Women's U23 K1 22.6 km:  Vanda Kiszli

Rowing
 January 16 – November 13: 2016 FISA Events Calendar

2016 Summer Olympics (FISA)
 August 6–13: 2016 Summer Olympics in  Rio de Janeiro at the Rodrigo de Freitas Lagoon

  won both the gold and overall medal tallies.

International rowing championships
 January 16: 2016 European Rowing Indoor Championships in  Győr
  won the gold medal tally. Poland, and  won 6 overall medals each.
 February 28: 2016 FISA Indoor Rowing World Championships in  Boston
 Men's Lightweight winner:  Steffen Bonde
 Men's Heavyweight winner:  James Letten 
 Women's Lightweight winner:  Robyn Hart-Winks
 Women's Heavyweight winner:  Michelle Lazorchak
 March 22–24: 2016 FISA Americas Olympic Qualification Regatta in  Valparaíso
 M1x winner:  Juan Carlos Cabrera Perez
 W1x winner:  Michelle Parson
 LM2x winners:  Xavier Vela Magi / Willian Giaretton
 LW2x winners:  Vanessa Cozzi / Fernanda Leal Ferreira
 March 25–27: 2016 South American Rowing Championship in  Curauma
  won the gold medal tally. Argentina and  won 11 overall medals each.
 April 21–23: 2016 Paralympic Qualification Regatta in  Gavirate
 ASW1X winner:  WANG Lili
 ASM1X winner:  Huang Cheng
 TAMix2X winners:  (LIU Shuang, FEI Tianming)
 LTAMix4+ winners: 
 April 23–25: 2016 FISA Asian and Oceania Olympic Qualification Regatta in  Chungju (at Tangeum Lake)
 M1x winner:  KIM Dong-yong
 W1x winner:  Kim Ye-ji
 LM2x winners:  (SUN Man, WANG Chunxin)
 LW2x winners:  (Ayami Oishi, Chiaki Tomita)
 May 6–8: 2016 European Rowing Championships in  Brandenburg an der Havel (at Lake Beetzsee)
  won the gold medal tally.  won the overall medal tally.
 May 22–25: 2016 FISA European and Final Olympic Qualification Regatta in  Lucerne (at Lake Rotsee)
 July 9 & 10: 2016 European Rowing Junior Championships in  Trakai (at Lake Galvė)
  won both the gold and overall medal tallies.
 August 21–28: 2016 World Rowing Championships in  Rotterdam (at the Willem-Alexander Baan)
  won both the gold and overall medal tallies.
 August 21–28: World Rowing Junior Championships 2016 in  Rotterdam
  won the gold medal tally.  won the overall medal tally.
 August 21–28: 2016 World Rowing U23 Championships in  Rotterdam
 The  won the gold medal tally.  won the overall medal tally.
 September 2–4: 2016 World University Rowing Championships in  Poznań
 The  and  won 4 gold medals each.  won the overall medal tally.
 September 9–11: 2016 World Rowing Masters Regatta in  Copenhagen (at Lake Bagsværd)
 For results, click here. 
 October 21–23: 2016 World Rowing Coastal Championships in 
 CM4x+ winner:  Team Dukla Praha
 CW2x winner:  Team Circolo Canottieri Saturnia
 CM1x winner:  Team Real Club Mediterraneo
 CW4x+ winner:  Team Club Nautique de Nice
 CM2x winner:  Team Real Círculo de Labradores
 CW1x winner:  Team Killorglin Rowing Club

2016 World Rowing Cup
 April 15–17: WRC #1 in  Varese (at Lake Varese)
 The  won both the gold and overall medal tallies.
 May 27–29: WRC #2 in  Lucerne (at Lake Rotsee)
  won both the gold and overall medal tallies.
 June 17–19: WRC #3 (final) in  Poznań (at Lake Malta)
  won the gold medal tally. New Zealand and  won 11 overall medals each.

Sailing

2016 Summer Olympics (ISAF)
 August 8–18: 2016 Summer Olympics in  Rio de Janeiro at the Marina da Glória
 Men
 Men's RS:X:   Dorian van Rijsselberghe;   Nick Dempsey;   Pierre Le Coq
 Men's Laser:   Tom Burton;   Tonči Stipanović;   Sam Meech
 Men's Finn:   Giles Scott;   Vasilij Žbogar;   Caleb Paine
 Men's 470:
   (Šime Fantela & Igor Marenić)
   (Mathew Belcher & William Ryan)
   (Panagiotis Mantis & Pavlos Kagialis)
 Men's 49er:
   (Peter Burling & Blair Tuke)
   (Nathan Outteridge & Iain Jensen)
   (Erik Heil & Thomas Plössel)
 Women
 Women's RS:X:   Charline Picon;   Chen Peina;   Stefania Elfutina
 Women's Laser Radial:   Marit Bouwmeester;   Annalise Murphy;   Anne-Marie Rindom
 Women's 470:
   (Hannah Mills & Saskia Clark)
   (Jo Aleh & Polly Powrie)
   (Camille Lecointre & Hélène Defrance)
 Women's 49erFX:
   (Martine Grael & Kahena Kunze)
   (Alex Maloney & Molly Meech)
   (Jena Hansen & Katja Salskov-Iversen)
 Mixed Narca 17:
   (Santiago Lange & Cecilia Carranza Saroli)
   (Jason Waterhouse & Lisa Darmanin)
   (Thomas Zajac & Tanja Frank)

World sailing championships
 June 14–18: 2016 ISAF Youth Match Racing World Championships in / Nouméa
 Winners:  (Will Dargaville, Sarah Parker, Josh Dawson, James Farquharson)
 September 21–25: 2016 ISAF Women's Match Racing World Championship in  Sheboygan, Wisconsin
 Winner:  Anna Kjellberg
 September 25–30: 2016 FISU World University Sailing Championship in  Perth
 Open and Women's winners: 
 December 14–20: 2016 ISAF Youth Sailing World Championships in  Auckland
 Note: Was scheduled to be held in Oman. However, it withdrew, due to the alleged national discriminatory practices against Israel.
  and  won 2 gold medals each.
 Nations Trophy winner:

2016 ISAF Sailing World Cup
 December 7–13, 2015: SWC #1 in  Melbourne (#1 and at Port Phillip)

  won both the gold and overall medal tallies.
 January 23–29: SWC #2 in  Miami (at Biscayne Bay)

The Netherlands won the overall medal tally. 
 April 25 – May 1: SWC #3 in  Hyères (at Rade de Hyères)

  and  won 2 gold medals each. Australia won the overall medal tally.
 June 6–12: SWC #4 in  Weymouth and Portland, Dorset (at both Portland Harbour and Weymouth Bay)

  won both the gold and overall medal tallies.
 September 19–25: SWC #5 in  Qingdao (at Fushan Bay)

  won both the gold and overall medal tallies.
 December 4–11: SWC #6 (final) in  Melbourne #2
 Note: Abu Dhabi withdrew from hosting this event from October 24–28, due to the allocation of the World Sailing Annual Conference to Europe.
  won both the gold and overall medal tallies.

Water polo
 September 4, 2015 – December 11, 2016: FINA General Events Calendar

2016 Summer Olympics (FINA–WP)
 August 6–20: 2016 Summer Olympics in  Rio de Janeiro at the Maria Lenk Aquatics Center
 Men:  ;  ;  
 Women:  ;  ;

World water polo championships
 August 26 – September 3: 2016 FINA Men's Youth Water Polo World Championships in  Podgorica
  defeated , 16–13, in the final.  took the bronze medal.
 December 12–18: 2016 FINA World Women's Youth Water Polo Championships in  Auckland
  defeated , 9–7, to win their first FINA World Women's Youth Water Polo Championships title.
  took the bronze medal.

FINA Water Polo World League
 October 20, 2015 – June 26, 2016: 2016 FINA Men's Water Polo World League
 October 20, 2015 – May 10, 2016: 2015–16 European six-round preliminary water polo matches
 May 10–15: 2016 Intercontinental water polo tournament (men) in  Yokohama
 June 21–26: 2016 FINA Men's Water Polo World League Superfinal in  Huizhou
  took the bronze medal.
 October 27, 2015 – June 12, 2016: 2016 FINA Women's Water Polo World League
 October 27, 2015 – May 3, 2016: 2015–16 European six-round preliminary water polo matches
 February 16–21: 2016 Intercontinental water polo tournament (women) in  Lewisville, Texas
 June 7–12: 2016 FINA Women's Water Polo World League Superfinal in  Shanghai
 The  defeated , 13–9, to win their third consecutive and tenth overall FINA Women's Water Polo World League title. 
  took the bronze medal.

LEN (Ligue Européenne de Natation)
 September 4, 2015 – June 4, 2016: 2015–16 LEN Champions League (final six in  Budapest)
  Jug Dubrovnik defeated  Olympiacos, 6–4, to win their fourth LEN Champions League title.  Szolnoki VSK took third place.
 September 30, 2015 – April 30, 2016: 2015–16 LEN Euro Cup
  AN Brescia defeated  Sintez Kazan, 23–10 on aggregate, to win their first LEN Euro Cup title.
 December 4, 2015 – April 23, 2016: 2015–16 LEN Women's Champions' Cup
 April 15 & 16: 2015–16 Women's LEN Trophy Final Four in  Mataró
  CN Mataró defeated  NC Vouliagmeni, 6–5, to win their first Women's LEN Trophy title.  Szentesi VK took the bronze medal.
 April 23 & 24: 2015–16 Women's LEN Euro League Final Four in  Sabadell
  CN Sabadell defeated  UVSE Budapest, 11–8, to win their fourth LEN Euro League Women title.  Kinef Kirishi took the bronze medal.
 January 10–23: 2016 European Water Polo Championships for Men and Women in  Belgrade
 Men:  defeated , 10–8, to win their third consecutive and four overall European Water Polo Championships title.  took third place.
 September 10–18: 2016 Women's European Under 19 Water Polo Championships in  The Hague
 The  defeated , 9–7, in the final.  took third place.
 September 11–18: 2016 Men's European Under 19 Water Polo Championships in  Alphen aan den Rijn
  defeated , 12–9, in the final.  took third place.

References

 
2016 in sports
Water sports by year
Aquatics